The Physics of Blown Sand and Desert Dunes (1941) is a science book, written by Ralph A. Bagnold.  The book laid the foundations of the scientific investigation of the transport of sand by wind.  It also discusses the formation and movement of sand dunes in the Libyan Desert. During his expeditions into the Libyan Desert, Bagnold had been fascinated by the shapes of the sand dunes, and after returning to England he built a wind tunnel and conducted the experiments which are the basis of the book. The book is still a main reference in the field, and was used by NASA, for instance, for studying sand dunes on Mars. It was reissued by Dover in 2005.

See also
Aeolian processes
Bagnold formula
Bagnold number
Barchan
Bibliography of Aeolian Research

References

External links
A short film containing an interview with R.A. Bagnold
British Army Officers 1939-1945

1941 non-fiction books
Physics books
Geology books
Methuen Publishing books
Books about Africa